The Exhibition subdivision of Saskatoon, Saskatchewan, Canada, is located on the banks of the South Saskatchewan River and was developed between the two major World Wars.  To the west is the Diefenbaker Management Area which boasts the Diefenbaker park and Pioneer Cemetery.  The park includes a medium-sized hill which is used for tobogganing and snowboarding, and the park itself is a frequently-used venue for picnics and public events and performances. The Exhibition community is also known as Thornton, after a (now-demolished) public elementary school that formerly served the area and early in its history also went by the name Bellevue.

The area also has an Esso Circle K (formerly a Petro Canada Mac’s)  located on the corner of Ruth Street East and Lorne Avenue

History

The Pioneer Cemetery received its first interment in 1884.  On June 20, 1905, the Nutana Cemetery Co was awarded a special grant at SW Section 20  Township 36 Range 5 W of the 3rd Meridian. The Pioneer Cemetery was also called the Nutana Cemetery, and was the first municipal cemetery for the City of Saskatoon until 1910 when Woodlawn Cemetery became the city cemetery.   The Pioneer Cemetery was declared a heritage site in 1982.

Exhibition, Saskatoon, Saskatchewan is at coordinates 

Sarah Shatwell Pendygrasse arrived from England in 1887 and was awarded a dominion land grant patent at SE section 20 township 36 range 5 W of the 3rd meridian, Saskatchewan provisional district, North West Territories, on December 12, 1892. Her son Harold L. S. Pendygrasse had a homestead at NE Section 20 township 35 Range 3 W of the 3rd meridian. At 1919 St. Henry Avenue, Exhibition subdivision the Pendygrasse Home built by Harold Pendygrasse in 1910 has been declared a municipal heritage site. It is built on the banks of the South Saskatchewan river east side of Saskatoon.

For many years, the community was known by the name Bellevue, and this is how it was listed in the Henderson's Directory up until as late as the 1940s.

Construction of the Idylwyld Freeway in the 1960s resulted in the Exhibition community being physically bisected, with several streets (most notably Coy and St. George Avenues, along with Adelaide, Hilliard and Isabella Streets) being realigned and what was at one time the city's main CN Rail line being removed. Only two east-west streets provide access to the western section of the community: Taylor Street West and Ruth Street West. In the 1980s, the city attempted to relocate the Exhibition Grounds to the north end of the city, opening the Exhibition Grounds up for residential development; voters defeated this plan in a plebiscite.

Public services

Saskatoon Light and Power provides electrical utilities to all Saskatoon neighbourhoods which existed prior to 1958. Water is treated and supplied by the City of Saskatoon Water and Wastewater Treatment Branch.  The Exhibition neighbourhood is a part of the East Division of the Saskatoon Police Services patrol system.  This division services east of the South Saskatchewan River which encompasses the thirty one neighbourhoods, two industrial areas.  The three Saskatoon hospitals are located in other nearby neighbourhoods. St. Paul's Hospital in the Central Division oversees the Central Business District, the Riversdale Business District, SIAST and nine other residential areas. The Exhibition neighbourhood is served by the City of Saskatoon Saskatoon Fire & Protective Services.

Demographics
I-neighbor sets the neighbourhood population at 31,474 consists of 12,567 residences. Family size is about 2.2 people, with an average family income of $46,242. The city of Saskatoon sets the 2007 population count at 2,767 with homeownership at 56.7%.

Governance
The exhibition exists within the federal electoral district of Saskatoon—Grasswood. It is currently represented by Kevin Waugh of the Conservative Party of Canada, first elected in 2015.

Provincially, the area is mostly within the constituency of Saskatoon Nutana. It is currently represented by Cathy Sproule of the Saskatchewan New Democratic Party, first elected in 2011. A small portion of the neighbourhood south of Adelaide Street is within the boundaries of Saskatoon Eastview.

In Saskatoon's non-partisan municipal politics, the area lies within ward 7. It is currently represented by Councillor Mairin Loewen, who was elected to city council in a 2011 by-election.

The Exhibition Community Association is formed of volunteers in the community and may petition the councillor, MLA or MP regarding infrastructure or public services for the neighbourhood.

Geography

The northern boundary is Taylor Street, and as previously mentioned, the western boundary is the South Saskatchewan River. The eastern edge is Melrose Avenue, and to the south are Ruth Street, the Prairieland Park and the Saskatchewan Western Development Museum.

Achs Park, ; Exhibition Park,  and Thornton Park,  are the three main parks in the neighbourhood. The Meewasin Valley Authority is developing parks and walk ways along the South Saskatchewan River. Along the west boundary of the Exhibition neighbourhood is Gabriel Dumont park as well as trails at the top and base of the riverbank.

Education

Saskatoon Seventh-day Adventist Christian School - private elementary, part of the Saskatoon Public School Division
St. Frances School - separate (Catholic) elementary, part of Greater Saskatoon Catholic Schools
The area's public elementary school, Thornton School, was decommissioned in 1986 and demolished in 1997. Students in the area who attend the public school are bused to Queen Elizabeth School.

Commercial
Commercial development includes a service station at the corner of Ruth Street and Lorne Avenue, commercial development at Lorne Avenue and Taylor Street, and a number of light-industrial businesses on St. George Avenue and Isabella Street West.

Arts and culture

Exhibition Community Association addresses concerns of the community and provides recreational events and activities year round for all ages.
Saskatchewan Western Development Museum is also located south of Ruth Street.
Prairieland Park or Saskatoon Exhibition Grounds are located south of Ruth Street.

References

External links

Saskatoon Neighbourhoods Word Search Puzzle
City of Saskatoon · Departments · Community Services · Community ... 
City of Saskatoon City of Saskatoon · Departments · Community Services · City Planning · ZAM Maps
Populace Spring 2006

Neighbourhoods in Saskatoon